You're Dead! is the fifth studio album by American music producer Flying Lotus, released on October 6, 2014 by Warp Records. Flying Lotus recorded the album at his home in Los Angeles, using Ableton Live and other instruments and software. Like his previous two albums Cosmogramma and Until the Quiet Comes, You're Dead! features extensive contributions from Thundercat, who plays bass guitar on nearly every track and provides vocals on several. It also features guest performances from Angel Deradoorian, Niki Randa, Kendrick Lamar, Snoop Dogg, and Thundercat, along with Captain Murphy, Flying Lotus' rapper alter ego.

You're Dead was promoted with the single "Never Catch Me", which was nominated for Best Dance Recording at the 2016 Grammy Awards. Mainly an instrumental album, You're Dead! is described as electronic, jazz fusion and hip hop. The album received widespread acclaim from critics, and peaked at number one at the US Dance/Electronic Albums and at number 19 at the US Billboard 200.

Background and recording
Ellison and Thundercat developed the concept of the album. He said in an interview with Los Angeles Times:  Originally conceived as a double album, Ellison worked on the album soon after finishing his previous album, with the intent of creating "the fastest, hardest, most intense jazz record". Like his previous album, Until the Quiet Comes, he used both Ableton Live and live instruments to make the album. His music gear included Moog Voyager, Fender Rhodes, and Wurlitzer electric pianos, as well as a Gibson guitar, a Carvin Legacy 3 all-tube 3-channel amp head, a bank of six Moogerfooger analog effects modules and two Technics SL-1200 turntables. Daddy Kev, who mastered the album, said that You're Dead! had the largest dynamic range of any of Ellison's work.

Music
You're Dead! is an electronic, jazz, jazz fusion and hip hop album. It is also a concept album about death and afterlife. In an interview with Electronic Musician, Ellison said, "It's like, 'Hey, you're dead, who knows what's next, but our spirits live forever, and you lived through the good and bad sh*t,' not, 'Hey, you're dead, it's over.'" The album has complex melodies, syncopated rhythms, and textured productions.

"Theme", initially called "Jodorowsky", was the song that led into the concept of the album. "Cold Dead" started with an iPhone voice memo. "Stirring" is a homage to Ellison's friend Nick Terry, who had then-recently died. "Coronus, the Terminator" was the first song Ellison made in his new home; "Siren Song" was written for Pharrell. "Eyes Above" has a beat that he created with FKA Twigs and Niki Randa. "The Beyond", dedicated to "an unborn child", is inspired by Fantastic Planet. According to Ellison, "Fkn Dead" was the most difficult song on the album to make, but the arrangement for "Turkey Dog Coma" was the most complex. In "The Boys Who Died in Their Sleep", Ellison raps, under his alias Captain Murphy, about "being comfortable in a cloud where nothing ever happens", while naming OxyContin, Vicodin and Xanax.

Artwork
The cover art for You're Dead! was designed by Japanese manga artist Shintaro Kago on the cover and inner sleeve, with further art being utilised in the accompanying live show. Much of the drawings featured men and women being disfigured and mutilated in unrealistic, hi-tech ways with a significant amount of gore and nudity.

Release
The album's title and release date were announced on July 22, 2014. On October 7, 2015, Flying Lotus released a deluxe version of the album containing the instrumentals and the previously Japanese exclusive bonus track "Protector".

Critical reception

You're Dead! was met with widespread critical acclaim. At Metacritic, which assigns a normalized rating out of 100 to reviews from professional publications, the album received an average score of 88, based on 36 reviews. Aggregator AnyDecentMusic? gave it 8.4 out of 10, based on their assessment of the critical consensus.

Andy Kellman of AllMusic stated, "Like his great aunt, and his great uncle John Coltrane, Ellison has created exceptionally progressive, stirring, and eternal art." Clayton Purdom of The A.V. Club stated, "You're Dead! is his most confidently structured work yet." Matthew Bennett of Clash stated, "This, his fifth album, is also an overt ode to limbo, the halfway house of consciousness and true death. And this is where all 19 tracks dwell, in between the failing light of traditional jazz and the bursts of neon emitted from his polyrhythmic, nocturnal electronica." Adam Kivel of Consequence of Sound stated, "The album works best as a single, unified listen." In a glowing review for The Guardian Paul MacInnes said, "There's always been a sense that Ellison was stretching for a new musical vernacular, one that would continue the lineage of free jazz (he is the great-nephew of Alice Coltrane). This album suggests he might have found it." Chris Cottingham of NME stated, "You're Dead! is a madly inventive record, one that takes hip-hop and jazz as starting points, beats them both to death and then brings them back to life in an almost unrecognisable form." Logan Smithson of PopMatters stated, "You're Dead! is arguably his most imposing album thus far."

Nate Patrin of Pitchfork stated, "Flying Lotus has the notion that death should be the only limiting factor, and when he's put out a work that wrings beauty out of that very thing, what's the point of fearing anything?" Will Hermes of Rolling Stone stated, "Ellison makes the boldest, most fully engaged fusion of the hip-hop-laptop era." Franklin Jones of Slant Magazine stated, "While it may not be clear where we're headed throughout the album, Ellison maneuvers through the bedlam with such confidence that it's not just easy to get swept up in his grand vision of the Great Beyond, but to return for repeat visits." Michael Blair of XXL applauded the album overall saying, "The genius of Flying Lotus, which has been invariably present throughout his preceding releases, but most especially on You’re Dead!, is that he has an incredible ability to both illustrate and extract exceptional amounts of emotion, without saying much at all." Staff writer at Exclaim! Stephen Carlickm described the album as, "Excitingly new yet classically evocative, You're Dead! is contemplative but never boring, an example of genre cross-pollination that transcends novelty and, occasionally, time and space as well." Robert Christgau was less enthusiastic in his column for Cuepoint, citing "Turkey Dog Coma" and "Ready err Not" as highlights and writing, "The problem isn't that it's less than the sum of its parts—the problem is that there is no sum, only parts".

Accolades

Commercial performance
The album debuted at number 19 on the US Billboard 200, with first-week sales of 17,000 copies in the United States. In its second week, the album dropped to number 67 on the chart, selling 5,000 copies, bringing its total album sales to 22,000 copies.

Track listing
All tracks produced by Flying Lotus.

Notes
 "Dead Man's Tetris" features uncredited vocals by Earl Sweatshirt

Sample credits
 "Turtles" contains a sample of "L'Uccello Dalle Piume Di Cristallo" composed and performed by Ennio Morricone.
 "Obligatory Cadence" contains a sample of "Green Dew" composed by C. Staker, performed by The French Ensemble.

Personnel
Credits adapted from the album's liner notes.

Musicians

 Flying Lotus – keyboards , sampling , backing vocals , percussion , synthesizers , vocals 
 Justin Brown – drums 
 Ronald Bruner – drums 
 Taylor Cannizzaro – strings 
 Brandon Coleman – keyboards 
 Gene Coye – drums 
 Laura Darlington – flute , vocals 
 Angel Deradoorian – vocals , backing vocals 
 Arlene Deradoorian – backing vocals 
 Miguel Atwood Ferguson – strings 
 Taylor Graves – keyboards 
 Herbie Hancock – keyboards 
 Kimbra Johnson – vocals 
 Kendrick Lamar – vocals 
 Jeff Lynne – guitar 
 Deantoni Parks – drums 
 Niki Randa – backing vocals , percussion , vocals
 Andres Renteria – percussion 
 Brendon Small – guitar 
 Snoop Dogg – vocals 
 Thundercat – bass guitar , guitar , backing vocals , vocals 
 Kamasi Washington – saxophone , keyboards 

Production

 Flying Lotus – producer
 Daddy Kev – mastering
 Derek "MixedByAli" Ali – vocal mixing for Kendrick Lamar 
 Rich Costey – mixing 
 Martin Cooke – assistant engineer 
 Nicolas Fournier – assistant engineer 
 Mario Borgatta – mixing assistant 

Design
 Stephen Serrato – design
 Shintaro Kago – illustrations

Charts

Weekly charts

Year-end charts

Notes

References

2014 albums
Albums produced by Flying Lotus
Concept albums
Flying Lotus albums
Jazz fusion albums by American artists
Instrumental hip hop albums
Warp (record label) albums